Cocaine Coup is a term that has been applied to:

 1980 Bolivian coup d'état of Luis García Meza Tejada
 1978 Honduran coup d'état of Policarpo Paz García